I See Red may refer to:

"I See Red" (Jim Rafferty song), 1982
"I See Red" (Split Enz song), 1978
I See Red (EP), an EP by Uh Huh Her